Novosapashevo (Yañı Hapaş) is a rural locality (a village) in Volostnovsky Selsoviet, Kugarchinsky District, Bashkortostan, Russia. The population was 37 as of 2010. There is 1 street.

Geography 
Novosapashevo is located 36 km northwest of Mrakovo (the district's administrative centre) by road. Volostnovka is the nearest rural locality.

References 

Rural localities in Kugarchinsky District